Juan Guillermo Vélez (born September 16, 1983 in Medellín, Colombia) is a Colombian professional footballer.

Teams
  Millonarios 2004–2006
  Leones 2006
  Atlético Bello 2006–2007
  Estrella Roja 2007–2008
  Aragua 2008
  Trujullanos 2008–2010
  Zamora 2010–2011
  Santa Fe 2011–2012
  Deportivo Pasto (loan) 2013–2014
  Alianza Atlético 2015–2019
  C.D. Luis Ángel Firpo 2019

References
 Profile at BDFA 
 

1983 births
Living people
Colombian footballers
Millonarios F.C. players
Leones F.C. footballers
Atlético Bello footballers
Aragua FC players
Trujillanos FC players
Zamora FC players
Independiente Santa Fe footballers
Deportivo Pasto footballers
Alianza Atlético footballers
Colombian expatriate footballers
Expatriate footballers in Venezuela
Expatriate footballers in Peru

Association footballers not categorized by position
Footballers from Medellín